András Wanié (23 April 1911 – 12 November 1976) was a Hungarian swimmer who competed in the 1928 Summer Olympics and 1932 Summer Olympics.

He was born in Szeged and died in Sacramento, California, United States.

In the 1928 Olympics he was fourth in the 4×200 m freestyle relay event.

Four years later he won a bronze medal in the 4×200 m freestyle relay event. He also was fourth in his first round heat of 100 m freestyle event and did not advance.

External links

1911 births
1976 deaths
Hungarian male swimmers
Olympic swimmers of Hungary
Swimmers at the 1928 Summer Olympics
Swimmers at the 1932 Summer Olympics
Olympic bronze medalists for Hungary
World record setters in swimming
Olympic bronze medalists in swimming
Hungarian male freestyle swimmers
European Aquatics Championships medalists in swimming
Medalists at the 1932 Summer Olympics
Hungarian emigrants to the United States
Sportspeople from Szeged